The Immortals is a 1973 novel by the French writer René Barjavel. It tells the story of a grand conspiracy between world leaders. It was published in English in 1974, translated by Eileen Finletter.

The book received the Prix Maison de la Presse. It was adapted into the 1989 television serial Le grand secret, directed by Jacques Trébouta.

References

1973 science fiction novels
1973 French novels
French alternate history novels
French novels adapted into films
French science fiction novels
French-language novels
Fiction about immortality
Novels by René Barjavel
Novels set on islands
Novels about viral outbreaks
Presses de la Cité books